A Monument to Peace: Our Hope for the Children is a monument by Avard Fairbanks, installed in Salt Lake City's Jordan Park in the U.S. state of Utah. The work has several titles and is sometimes considered more than one sculpture. Other titles include:

 International Peace Garden Monument: Our Hope for the Children
 International Peace Garden Monument: Peace on Earth
 Our Hope for the Children
 Peace on Earth
 The Dawn of a New Era
 The Dawn of a New Era: Peace

Description and history
The monument represents the United States in Jordan Park's International Peace Gardens. Inscriptions read "Our hope for the children", "Peace on Earth", and "The Dawn of a New Era". The artwork is administered by Salt Lake County's Parks and Recreation department. It was surveyed by the Smithsonian Institution's "Save Outdoor Sculpture" program in 1993–1994. The monument has been included in published walking tours of Salt Lake City.

See also

 List of public art in Salt Lake City

References

External links

Monuments and memorials in Utah
Outdoor sculptures in Salt Lake City
Peace monuments and memorials
Sculptures by Avard Fairbanks
Sculptures of children in the United States
Sculptures of women in Utah